Ravenscroft may refer to:

People
 John Ravenscroft (disambiguation), several people
 Christopher Ravenscroft (born 1946), English actor
 Edward Ravenscroft (c. 1654–1697), English dramatist
 Edward James Ravenscroft (1816–1890), author of Pinetum Britannicum
 George Ravenscroft (1632–1683), developer of lead crystal glass in England
 Raphael Ravenscroft (1954–2014), saxophonist
 Steve Ravenscroft (born 1970), rugby player
 Thomas Ravenscroft (c. 1588–1635), English composer
 Thomas Ravenscroft (died 1681), English politician and civil war officer
 Tim Ravenscroft (born 1992), Guernsey cricketer
 Tom Ravenscroft (born 1980), British radio presenter and disc jockey.
 Trevor Ravenscroft, author
 Thurl Ravenscroft (1914–2005), American voice actor and singer
 William Ravenscroft (1561–1628), English politician 
 Ravenscroft Stewart (1845–1921), Anglican priest

Characters
 Alistair, Margaret, and Celia Ravenscroft, characters in Agatha Christie's novel Elephants Can Remember
 Pam Ravenscroft, character from The Southern Vampire Mysteries by Charlaine Harris

Places 
 Ravenscroft, Tennessee
 Ravenscroft School, Raleigh, North Carolina, United States
 Ravenscroft School (Asheville, North Carolina), United States
 Ravenscroft School, Somerset, England

Other 
 Ravenscroft Psalter
 Ede & Ravenscroft, tailors

See also 
 

English-language surnames